Yin Hong (born 15 January 1976) is a Chinese freestyle skier. She competed at the 1994 Winter Olympics and the 1998 Winter Olympics.

References

1976 births
Living people
Chinese female freestyle skiers
Olympic freestyle skiers of China
Freestyle skiers at the 1994 Winter Olympics
Freestyle skiers at the 1998 Winter Olympics
Place of birth missing (living people)
Asian Games medalists in freestyle skiing
Freestyle skiers at the 1996 Asian Winter Games
Asian Games bronze medalists for China
Medalists at the 1996 Asian Winter Games